Cypert is a surname. Notable people with the surname include:

Boyd Cypert (1889–1973), American baseball player, lawyer, and politician
Cynthia Cypert, American actress
Lillie Cypert (1890–1954), American missionary
Chief Tahachee aka Jeff Davis "Tahchee" Cypert (1904-1978), American author, actor, stuntman